Trechus novaculosus is a species of ground beetle in the subfamily Trechinae. It was described by Barr in 1962.

References

novaculosus
Beetles described in 1962